The Darkside (or Darkside) were an indie rock band formed in 1989 by former members of Spacemen 3. After releasing two studio albums they split up in 1993.

History
The band formed in Rugby in 1989 and was led by Pete Bain (aka Bassman), who had left Spacemen 3 just before their 1989 album Playing With Fire. Bain was then joined in the new outfit by his former bandmate, drummer Sterling Roswell (aka Rosco). Vocals were initially handled by Nick Hayden, but his departure forced Bain to assume that role. The group were signed to Beggars Banquet Records offshoot Situation Two throughout their existence.

Contrary to much of what is written about the band, Hayden has always claimed he was a founding member, once played with Spacemen 3 himself and wrote most of the band's early material (although credited to 'The Darkside' on record labels). Lead vocalist Hayden also played a guitar for the group. Hayden left the band shortly before he was due to go on stage at a gig in Oxford. Hayden then formed the Oxford band Flite 118 whose set list included much of the early Darkside songs such as "High Rise Love", "Ocean of Fire" and "Can't Think Straight".

The group debuted in April 1990 with the single "High Rise Love", which was followed by "Waiting for the Angels" and the album, All That Noise. With Rosco moving to keyboards, the group recruited Craig Wagstaff, whom they had known while in Spacemen 3. The band's next release was the mail-order only Psychedelicise Suburbia live album in 1991. In November 1991, the EP "Always Pleasure" preceded second studio album Melomania, which was released in January 1992. With the departure of guitarist Kevin Cowen following the LP's release, Bain then assumed guitar duties for the EP Mayhem to Meditate. When Situation Two rejected the demos cut for a third LP, the band disintegrated.

Since the band's split, Bain has recorded several albums under the Alpha Stone name and guested on several of former bandmate Peter Kember's E.A.R albums. Rosco has issued the solo album Ubik under his assumed name Sterling Roswell.

In 2017, the group released the five-disc box set Complete Studio Masters featuring nearly the entirety of its discography remastered, excepting the songs from "High Rise Love." The box set included demo versions, live versions, and previously unreleased songs.

Discography

Albums
 "All That Noise" (1990), Situation Two
 "Psychedelicise Suburbia" (1991), Acid Ray
 "Melomania" (1992), Situation Two

EPs
 "High Rise Love EP" (1990), Situation Two
 "Loaded on Bliss EP" (1991), Munster Records
 "Mayhem to Meditate EP" (1992), Situation Two
 "Lunar Surf" (1993), Bomp!

Singles
 "Waiting for the Angels" (1991), Situation Two
 "Always Pleasure" (1991), Situation Two
 "Jukebox at Munsters" (1993), Munster Records

Box Sets
 "Complete Studio Masters" (2017), Acid Ray / Media Roscom Productions

References

Sources
 Erik Morse: Spacemen 3 & The Birth of Spiritualized (2004)

External links
 MySpace fan site

English indie rock groups
Situation Two artists